Kaatrukkena Veli (What's the need of fence for air?) is a 2021 Indian-Tamil language drama starring Priyanka Kumar and Swaminathan Anandharaman. It is an official remake of Star Jalsha serial Mohor. It premiered on 18 January 2021, and airs on Star Vijay and is also available on the digital platform Disney+ Hotstar before it's telecast.

Plot 
The story revolves around Vennila, an undergraduate student who aspires to be a IAS officer. When her father forces her to get married after finishing school, she flees her wedding with the aid of her mother. With her former teacher Sharadha's help, she joins the Meenakshi Shivanandham college, which is owned and run by Sharadha's in-laws. The story presents Vennila's struggle for her right to study at the college, as her pursuit of education faces continuous opposition from both Sharadha's in-laws and members of her own family alike. Together with her college friends, and with the help of Surya, her Economics professor and Sharadha's estranged son, she overcomes each obstacle that is thrown her way. Slowly but inevitably, Vennila and Surya begin to fall for each other.

Cast

Main 
 Priyanka Kumar as Vennila Varadharajan
 Varadharajan and Vasuki's youngest daughter. Sowmya and Vishnu's younger sister. And an undergraduate student from a small village, who aspires to be a collector. She is a focused and hardworking girl who believes in gender equality. She elopes from her forced wedding in order to pursue her dreams. She moves to Chennai to join the top college there and continue her education. Surya's love interest. (2021–present)
 Darshan K. Raju / Swaminathan Anantharaman as Surya Mahadevan. 
 Mahadevan and Sharadha's only son. Shivanandham, Meenakshi, Vishwanathan, Bhanu's nephew. Abhinaya and Anandhi's cousin. Former misogynist, Vennila's economics professor and a board member of the college. He hated his mother because he assumed that his mother left him to pursue her career. Initially, he hated Vennila as she is Sharadha's student but later accepted her. Vennila's love interest.

Supporting 
 Malavika Avinash (2021) / Jyothi Rai (2021-2022) / Harsha Nair (2023-Present) as Sharadha Mahadevan 
 Mahadevan's wife, Surya's mother, Vennila's old professor and mentor. Though she left Surya's house to take care of her parents, her son Surya believes that she left for her career. She loves Surya and is Vennila's mentor.
 Bhanu Prakash as Mahadevan
 Surya's father and Sharatha's husband. Shivanantham's forst younger brother and Vishwanathan's second elder brother. He is the Deputy of the college, he has helped and supported Vennila.
 Veena Venkatesh / Sujatha Panju as Meenakshi Shivanantham 
 Shivanantham's wife. Surya's aunt-turned-foster mother. She sees Sharadha as a rival and instigates Surya against her by telling him that Sharadha left him to focus on her career. She too hates Venilla because Venilla is Sharadha's student.
 Akshitha Ashok as Abhi Vishwanathan
 Surya's sister, she is against Vennila
 Preetha Reddy as Anandhi Vishwanathan
 Abhi's twin and sidekick. Surya's cousin. She often helps Abhi with her ploys to kick Vennila out of the college, but later supports Vennila.
 Aarthi Ramkumar as Bhanumathi
 Vishwa's wife and Abhi and Ananthi's mother. Surya's aunt. She supports Vennila and Sharadha.
 Sridevi Ashok as Shyamala
 Meenakshi's daughter-in-law and Surya's sister-in-law. Her husband works abroad. Later on in the series Surya confides in Shyamala about his feelings towards Vennila, and helps him pursue his feelings.
 Tarun Master as Shivanantham
 Surya's older uncle and Meenakshi's husband. Mahadevan and Vishwanathan's older brother. He is the chairman and one of the founders of the college Vennila studies at and Surya teaches at. He becomes fonder of Vennila after she helps Anandhi out of a difficult situation.
 Raj Khanna as Vishwanathan 
 Surya's uncle and Bhanu's husband; Abhi and Ananthi's father; Mahadevan and Shivanantham's younger brother.
 Reshmaa as Sowmya Madhavan 
(Deceased) Varadharajan and Vasuki's elder daughter. Vishnu and Vennila's Sister. Madhavan's wife. She supports Vennila. She is killed by Madhavan.
 Maanas Chavali as Madhavan
 Maragathavalli's son. Sowmya's husband. Vishnu and Vennila's brother-in-law. He lusts for Vennila and is abusive towards her sister Sowmya. He constantly plots for an opportunity to force himself upon Vennila.He killed Sowmya.
 Padmini as Vasuki
 Varatharajan's wife. Sowmya, Vishnu and Vennila's mother, she helped Vennila to elope from her forced marriage.
 Nalinikanth as Varatharajan Ramakrishna
 He is Vennila's father, who wanted her to marry a womanizer in exchange for his son being offered a government job by the groom's family. He feels that girls should be married and not study. He wants revenge against Sharadha for helping Vennila elope from her wedding.
 P. R. Varalakshmi as Venneila's grandmother 
 Varatharajan's mother. She wants Vennila to achieve her dreams.
 Shammi as Maragathavalli, Madhavan Mother
 Shyam Sundar as Madhavan Father
 Dayana as Roopa, Vennila friend in college
 Raghavendran Puli / Chandru as Maaran, Vennila Friend in college.
 Harish as Seenu, Surya Best friend 
 Gana Hari as Tamizh, Vennila friend in college
 Dhilip Kumar as Akash, Vennila friend in college

Cameo appearances 
 Janani Ashok Kumar as Madhuvarshini
 Surya's ex-fiancé who was rejected by Surya after she asked to delay their wedding in order to study abroad (2021)

Adaptations

References

External links 
 Kaatrukkenna Veli on Hotstar

Star Vijay original programming
Television shows set in Tamil Nadu
Tamil-language romance television series
2021 Tamil-language television series debuts
Tamil-language television series based on Bengali-languages television series
Tamil-language television soap operas
Tamil-language television shows